The Minnesota Supreme Court is the highest court in the U.S. state of Minnesota. The court hears cases in the Supreme Court chamber in the Minnesota State Capitol or in the nearby Minnesota Judicial Center.

History
The court was first assembled as a three-judge panel in 1849 when Minnesota was still a territory. The first members were lawyers from outside the region, appointed by President Zachary Taylor. The court system was rearranged when Minnesota became a state in 1858.

Appeals from Minnesota District Courts went directly to the Minnesota Supreme Court until the Minnesota Court of Appeals, an intermediate appellate court, was created in 1983 to handle most of those cases. The court now considers about 900 appeals per year and accepts review in about one in eight cases. Before the Court of Appeals was created, the Minnesota Supreme Court handled about 1,800 cases a year. Certain appeals can go directly to the Supreme Court, such as those involving taxes, first degree murder, and workers' compensation.

Composition
The seven justices of the Minnesota Supreme Court are elected to renewable six-year terms. When a midterm vacancy occurs, the governor of Minnesota appoints a replacement to a term that ends after the general election occurring more than one year after the appointment. Most vacancies occur during a term. The most recent election to an open seat on the court was in 1992, when former Minnesota Vikings player Alan Page was elected. Judges in Minnesota have a mandatory retirement age of 70.

Anne McKeig, a descendant of the White Earth Band of Ojibwe, became the first Native American justice in 2016. Her appointment also marked the second time the court had a majority of women since 1991.

In May 2020, Governor Tim Walz announced the appointment of Nobles County District Judge Gordon Moore, who replaced retiring Justice David Lillehaug.

Salary 
The salary for the Supreme Court Chief Justice is $205,362 and $186,692 for associate justices.

Members

Images

Important cases
 Baker v. Nelson, 291 Minn. 310, 191 N.W.2d 185 (1971), in which the Court held that denial of the statutory entitlement demanded by gay citizens to marry the adult of one's choice does not offend the United States Constitution; overturned by Obergefell v. Hodges, .
 Doe v. Gomez, 27 Minn. 542 N.W.2d 17 (1995), in which the Court held that on-demand abortion in the state is constitutional.

See also
 Courts of Minnesota

References

External links
 Official website

 
Minnesota state courts
State supreme courts of the United States
1858 establishments in Minnesota
Courts and tribunals established in 1858
1849 establishments in Minnesota Territory
Courts and tribunals established in 1849